Dolla is a village in County Tipperary in Ireland, on the crossroads of the R497 and R499 regional roads.

Services in Dolla include a public house, petrol station, shop-pub and a post office. The Silvermines GAA Club pitch and club house are also located in Dolla.

The Garda Station is a protected structure under the County Development Plan. The structure was a former RIC barracks and was built c. 1890. The structure is the oldest building within the settlement boundary.

Notable people 
 Sean Mackey, engineer
 Martin Ryan, publican

See also
List of towns and villages in Ireland

External links
 Dolla Settlement Plan

References

Towns and villages in County Tipperary